South Mountain High School (The Academies at South Mountain) is a high school located in Phoenix, Arizona. The school is part of the Phoenix Union High School District.

Overview 
The school was founded in 1954. The school shares its name with South Mountain, which is located south of the campus.

The campus was designed by a group of noted local architects consisting of Mel Ensign as supervising architect, and H. H. Green, Lescher & Mahoney, John Sing Tang, Edward L. Varney and Weaver & Drover. The construction contract to build the school was awarded to The Wes Meyer Construction Co. The campus was heavily renovated in 2019 with ADM Group serving as architect.

The school partner's elementary district is Roosevelt.

School boundary 
Like all Phoenix Union High School District schools, students who live within a specific geographic area of Phoenix are automatically enrolled at South Mountain High School. , the school serves students in an area south of the Salt River, north of the South Mountain, east of Central Avenue, and west of 40th Street. However, open enrollment is allowed.

Student population 
Phoenix Union lists its overall ethnic breakdown as 81.7% Hispanic, 8.3% African American, 4.4% Caucasian, 2.4% Native American, 1.6% Asian, 1.6% Other.

Magnet programs
South Mountain High School teaches five of the eleven Magnet programs in the Phoenix Union High School District.
 Aviation and Aerospace Education: The program provides students with the opportunity to attain a Private Pilot's Certificate without cost, as part of the curriculum. Since its inception, the program has produced over 400 pilots. The program also provides students with academic and hands-on training in such areas as air traffic control, airframe and power plant maintenance and pre-engineering. Students can earn college credit in the Air Traffic Control courses and build time towards their Airframe and Power Plant License. The pre-engineering courses offer students the opportunity to learn aerodynamics, power plant operation and theory, aerospace systems, and stability and control. A course in Aircraft Design is also provided. All of the courses provide students with the academic rigor necessary in the areas of mathematics and science associated with the field of aerospace.
 Law-Related Studies: The Center for Law Related Studies at South Mountain High School. This program offers the student a chance to explore career opportunities in law and law-related fields and occupations through course work and involvement with the various legal professions in the community.
 Performing Arts (Dance, Music, and Theater): The Center for Performing Arts is located at South Mountain High School.  Learning situations are provided through the use of equipment, nationally and internationally recognized artists as guest teachers, field trips and community performances.
 Visual Arts: The Center for Visual Arts offers students a four-year sequenced program of study in art disciplines.  Students develop their style in ceramics, computer art, drawing/painting, jewelry and fiber arts, photography or sculpture.  Students exhibit their work, participate in field trips and interact with local and national professional artists.
 Communication Arts: South Mountain is one of a small number of schools in Arizona with a magnet program featuring its own radio station: KJAG 1640AM, Jaguar News. This program teaches students to operate the devises used behind the scenes in T.V.

Facts
 South Mountain is a Performing school, according to the Arizona Department of Education.
 South's Academic Decathlon team has qualified for State 22 of the last 23 years. South won its first Regional title in 2008; came in second in 2007, 2009, and 2011; and won its second and third Regional titles in 2012 and 2013.  The team has finished in the top 10 at the State Tournament multiple times, most recently in 2013.  The Jaguars have had the overall highest-scoring competitor in four different Regional Competitions:  Stanford Prescott (2007), Rachel Riley (2008), and Connor Wade (2012 and 2013). Todd Decker has been coaching the team for 23 years and has done so longer than any other coach in Arizona.
 There are eleven Nationally Board Certified Teachers among South Mountain's staff.
 South has won 33 State championships in interscholastic athletics, including Girls Basketball, and a fourth-consecutive title in Girls Track and Field in 2008.

Athletic achievements
 Football – State co-champions 1958 & 1959, 1976–1977, 1993–1994
 Girls Track and Field – First big school in Arizona to win the State Title 4 consecutive years. State Champions 2005, 2006, 2007 & 2008, 2014–2015
 Boys Basketball State Champions 1956, 1983, 1987, 1991, 1992, 2006
 Girls Basketball State Champions 1985, 1995, 2008, 2015–2016.
 Step Team State Champions (2007, 2008); Stepping in the Right Direction Champions, CA (2011, 2012); Stomp Wars Champions, Dallas, TX (2013); Break the Stage Champions, Atlanta, GA (2014).
 Metro Region Champions:
 1982 – Boys Basketball
 1983 – Boys Basketball
 1987 – Boys Basketball
 1990 – Boys Basketball
 1991 – Boys Basketball
 1992 – Boys Basketball
 2001 – Wrestling (Gabriel Willford)
 2001 – Wrestling (Seth Willford)
 2006 – Boys Basketball
 2005 – Girls Basketball, Girls Track and Field
 2006 – Girls Basketball, Boys Basketball, Girls Track & Field, Boys Track & Field
 2007 – Girls Basketball, Girls Softball, Girls Track & Field, Boys Track & Field, Wrestling, Football
 2008 – Football, Volleyball, Girls Cross Country, Girls Basketball, Girls Track & Field, Boys Track & Field
 Soccer Division II State Champions 2015–2016

Incidents 
The school has seen incidents of violence over the years.

1970s 
A riot brought on by racial tensions happened at the school at some point during the 1970s.

1994 
In October 1994, racial tensions between the school's African American and Hispanic population erupted into a riot. A report by Phoenix newspaper Arizona Republic indicated the fight involved 1,000 students, and the incident reportedly spilled into neighborhoods surrounding the school.

The incident reportedly happened in the aftermath of a shooting that injured a Hispanic senior student was a member of a Bloods gang. The suspect in the shooting was reportedly an African American Crips gang member.

No guns or knives were used during the riot, but it involved other weapons such as metal pipes and tree branches. Dozens were reportedly injured, and the incident resulted in the arrest of 18 people. School security, along with Phoenix Police Department and Arizona Department of Public Safety officers, joined forces to separate the African American and Hispanic students, and stop the riot at the school.

Overcrowding at the school was seen, at least by school officials at the time, as a cause for the incident.

2009 
In February 2009, a riot involving up to 300 people either fighting or cheering took place, as school was letting out. A school resource officer, as well as a Phoenix Police officer, were assaulted, and in the end, 40 officers were called to subdue the riot. 12 people, including 10 juveniles and 2 adults, were arrested.

Notable alumni

 Rashad Bauman, former NFL Player – Washington Redskins
 Preston Dennard, former NFL Wide receiver – Los Angeles Rams
 Byron Evans, former NFL Linebacker – Philadelphia Eagles
 Dwayne Evans, 1976 Olympic Bronze Medalist
 Terry Fair, former Defensive Back – Detroit Lions
 Manny Hendrix, former NFL Cornerback – Dallas Cowboys
 Carl Johnson, former NFL player
 Steve Jordan, former NFL Player – Minnesota Vikings
 Sandra Kennedy, former Minority Leader, Arizona State Senate
 Jason Shivers, Defensive Back for the New York Giants
 Bob Wallace, former NFL Wide receiver – Chicago Bears
 Terry Wright, former NFL and CFL player

References

External links
 South Mountain High School
 Phoenix Union High School District website
 Arizona Department of Education School Report Card
 Facebook
 Twitter

1954 establishments in Arizona
Educational institutions established in 1954
High schools in Phoenix, Arizona
Public high schools in Arizona